Jonathan Kent and Martha Kent (often referred to as "Pa" and "Ma" Kent, respectively) are fictional characters in American comic books published by DC Comics. They are the adoptive parents of Superman. They live in the rural town of Smallville, Kansas. In most versions of Superman's origin story, Jonathan and Martha find Kal-El as an infant after he crash-lands on Earth following the destruction of his home planet, Krypton. They adopt him shortly thereafter, renaming him Clark Kent, "Clark" being Martha's maiden name.

The Kents are usually portrayed as loving parents who instill within Clark a strong moral compass, and they encourage Clark to use his powers for the betterment of humanity. In a few continuities, Martha is also the one who creates Clark's superhero costume. Oftentimes Martha's weaving of the outfit comes from the baby blankets Clark's biological parents had swaddled him in before enclosing him in the capsule, which are found to withstand virtually all hazards.

In Pre-Crisis continuity, the Kents die shortly after Clark's high school graduation. In post-Crisis continuity, they both remain alive even after Clark becomes an adult, with the Kents as supporting characters until Jonathan's death during an attack by the supervillain Brainiac. Martha remains a supporting character in Superman comics until 2011's "The New 52" continuity reboot, in which both she and her husband are deceased, having been killed by a drunk driver. They are brought back to life in 2019, in the aftermath of the "DC Rebirth" relaunch.

Glenn Ford and Phyllis Thaxter portrayed Jonathan and Martha in the 1978 film Superman: The Movie. Annette O'Toole and John Schneider portrayed the couple in the 2001 series Smallville. Eva Marie Saint portrayed Martha in the 2006 film Superman Returns. Kevin Costner and Diane Lane portray Jonathan and Martha Kent in the DC Extended Universe. Michele Scarabelli and Fred Henderson portray the couple in the 2021 series Superman & Lois.

Biography

Golden and Silver Age versions
Although a "passing motorist" is described as having found the infant Kal-El in the character's first appearance in 1938's Action Comics #1, 1939's Superman #1 introduces Superman's adoptive parents to the mythos, with "Mary Kent" being the only parent given a name. The Kents' first names vary in stories from the 1940s. A 1942 Superman novel, The Adventures of Superman by George Lowther, gave the names "Eben and Sarah Kent"; Eben and Martha Kent were used in the 1948 Superman film serial; while Eben and Sarah Kent were used in the 1952 première of Adventures of Superman television series, but the first extensive retelling of Superman's origin in Superman #53 (July–August 1948, billed as the "10th Anniversary Issue!") names them "John and Mary Kent". This issue firmly establishes that it is the Kents who discover the infant Kal-El. The Kents take him to a "home for foundlings" and express an interest in adopting him, to which the home readily agrees after suffering the disruption of the infant's growing abilities. This story also establishes that "Clark" is Mary Kent's maiden name. Mary and John Kent die of natural causes as "Clark grew to manhood", with John on his deathbed imploring Clark to become "a powerful force for good" and suggesting that Clark is a "Superman", a name adopted by Clark in the story's final panel. Oddly, no mention of "Superboy" is included, though that feature had already been established.

Pa Kent is first named Jonathan in Adventure Comics v1 #149 (Feb 1950). Ma Kent is first named Marthe in Superboy v1 #12 (Jan-Feb 1951) and Martha in subsequent appearances. Her full name is given as Martha Hudson Clark Kent in answer to a letter writer's query in Superman v1 #148 (Oct 1961). Later stories, after the early 1960s introduction of DC's Multiverse system, declare that the early version of the Kents are named "John and Mary Kent" and live on the world of "Earth-Two", home of the Golden Age DC superheroes, while the more modern Jonathan and Martha Kent live on the world of "Earth-One", home of the Silver Age DC superheroes.

The Kents made few appearances in Superman stories until the introduction of the Superboy comic book series in 1949. In this series, they are regular supporting characters of the teenage superhero. The Superboy stories establish the Kents' backstory. Jonathan, a former race car driver, is a farmer on a farm just outside Smallville. After he and Martha find the toddler Kal-El in his rocket, they take him to the Smallville Orphanage and later formally adopt him, naming him "Clark". They soon discover that Clark possesses a fantastic array of superpowers. Around the time Clark starts school, the Kents sell their farm, and the family moves into Smallville, where they open a general store. During Clark's early grade school years, Jonathan trains young Clark in the use of his superpowers to the best of his knowledge while urging him to keep the use of his powers a secret. At the age of eight, Clark begins a superhero career as Superboy. Martha creates Superboy's costume out of the blankets inside the rocket that brought him to Earth, and Jonathan helps him to create a means of making Superboy and Clark appear to be different people by developing Clark's secret identity as a mild-mannered, reserved individual. The Kents assist their adopted son on many adventures as Superboy.

In Superboy vol. 1 #145 (March 1968), Jonathan and Martha are rejuvenated physically and appear younger due to the influence of an alien serum. After this, Jonathan and Martha were drawn by artists as late middle-aged — as opposed to elderly — in appearance until Superman's 1986 reboot. (Action Comics #500 recounts that the serum eventually wore off just before Clark's high school graduation, and the Kents gradually reverted to their true ages and elderly appearances.)  After Clark graduates from high school, Jonathan and Martha take a vacation to the Caribbean Islands, where they contract a fatal tropical disease after handling materials from a pirate's treasure chest they had exhumed; despite Superboy's best efforts, Martha dies, with Jonathan dying soon thereafter. Before dying, Jonathan reminds Clark that he must always use his powers for the benefit of humanity. Clark mourns his parents and moves to Metropolis to attend college.

In Superman and Superboy stories prior to 1986, both the Kents die before the beginning of Clark's adult career as Superman. However, Jonathan did receive one opportunity to see his adopted son as the Man of Steel. After Superboy assists a group of interplanetary farmers from an alien world, they repay him by granting Jonathan's subconscious desire to see Clark in the future as Superman. Using their advanced technology, they place an artificially aged Jonathan years into the future, warping reality to make it appear that he had never died, and had maintained contact with his son all along. After spending 30 hours in the future with his adult son, Jonathan is returned by the aliens to his proper time period. The incident is removed from everyone's conscious memory, and the timeline is restored to normal.

Modern Age versions

The Man of Steel

After comics writer John Byrne rewrote Superman's origin in the 1986 The Man of Steel limited series, one of the changes he made was keeping Jonathan and Martha Kent alive into Clark's adulthood. The Kents have the same role as in the earlier stories, instilling within Clark the morals needed to become a strong and heroic figure. A Legion of Super-Heroes/Superman team-up that was written to explain why the Legion still exists even without Superboy confirms that post-Crisis Jonathan and Martha Kent are younger than their pre-Crisis counterparts, explaining in part why they live on in Clark's adult life.

In this version of events, after a Kryptonian "birthing matrix" lands on Earth, Jonathan and Martha find a newborn infant inside. Taking the infant in just before a major snowstorm strikes (that buried Smallville in snow for a number of months and cut off outsiders' access to the Kent family farm), the couple decides to pass the infant off as their own natural child, naming him "Clark", exploiting Martha's past miscarriages to justify their decision to keep their 'latest pregnancy' a secret. Clark's powers slowly develop, with his powers fully emerging once he reaches his late teens. After Clark's high school graduation, the Kents tell Clark about his true origins, and Clark leaves Smallville to explore the outside world. After Clark moves to Metropolis, Jonathan and Martha help Clark to create a superhero identity. They are later present when Clark finally discovers a holographic message in his ship from his biological father, Jor-El; prior to this the Kents had assumed that the ship was from another country's space program.

In the Man of Steel mini-series and afterwards, the Kents remain farmers through Clark's adult years, although a storyline features them having opened a general store in Smallville. Although Jonathan is still alive in the comics, he suffers a heart attack after The Death of Superman storyline, and he meets Clark in the afterlife and encourages him to return to life with him, suggested to be one of several factors that allowed Superman to return to life. The Kents' post-Crisis history is more fully fleshed out in the late 1980s limited series The World of Smallville, with Jonathan's ancestors' history more fully explored in the 1990s limited series The Kents, which reveals that the Kent family were resolute abolitionists who moved to Kansas to participate in the fight to establish it as a Free State during that region's violent pre-American Civil War period known as Bleeding Kansas.

Following Clark reaching adulthood and moving to Metropolis, the Kents continue to play a prominent role in Clark's life, and also in the lives of his extended alien family. When the Matrix Supergirl arrives on earth, she moves in for a time with the Kents, who treat her a like a daughter despite such issues as her relationship with Lex Luthor (currently posing as his own son after his brain was transplanted into a clone) and her own guilt about 'subverting' the life of Linda Danvers when Matrix unwittingly merged with the dying Linda. After Supergirl revealed that part of her life to the Kents, Jonathan visited the Danvers to help Linda's father Fred adapt to their mutual daughter's unconventional status. The Kents later take in Clark's half-clone, Kon-El, also known as Superboy. They give him the name Conner Kent and care for him in much the same was as they did Clark. However, Conner is not Clark, and while he appreciates everything the Kents did, he does not much like living on a farm. The couple find themselves childless again when Conner dies during the Infinite Crisis. Afterwards, Kara Zor-El, (Clark's recently discovered cousin) visits, questioning the Kents as to why Clark never asked that she live with them. The Kents also help Lois and Clark in dealing with their adopted son, Chris Kent.

Birthright
The Kents were again altered in 2003's Superman: Birthright limited series by Mark Waid, which again revised Superman's origins. Jonathan is portrayed as having a more strained relationship with his son, mainly due to Jonathan's childhood experiences with his overbearing father, and he and Martha are depicted as far younger at the time of Clark adopting his Superman identity than in past portrayals, appearing here to be scarcely middle-aged.

The Kents' appearances were altered to resemble the younger versions of actor John Schneider and actress Annette O'Toole, who portray the Kents in the Smallville television series. Although now shown wearing glasses, Jonathan has a full head of blond hair, and Martha has long red tresses. This younger portrayal of the Kents has persisted in the regular DC Universe since Birthright was published.

After Birthright
After the "Infinite Crisis" storyline, Superman's continuity was revised yet again from the Birthright origin, as briefly summarized in Action Comics #850. Although various aspects of his past are clearly retconned from the Birthright version, there is little to specifically indicate that the Kents themselves have been substantially changed. They are initially still depicted with younger appearances and the Schneider and O'Toole likenesses; however, this eventually gives way to older, more traditionally generic, gray-haired representations.

A new origin story for Superman was revealed in Geoff Johns and Gary Frank's Superman: Secret Origin. This origin for the most part follows closely with the Silver Age history. For example, Clark's Superboy storyline is re-introduced, as is his history with the Legion of Super-Heroes. Also, unlike Birthright, Jonathan is shown to have an equal standing as Martha in helping Clark create his heroic identity. Martha and Jonathan are the ones who suggest Clark dons a superhero costume, which initially Clark is not fond of. When Clark feels different from native Earth children, Martha relates with a story of her own family coming to terms in America, having emigrated from Germany long ago. In this version, the Kents are both shown to already have graying hair when they find the baby Kal-El, but are still drawn to be considerably younger, more in-tune to their Birthright counterparts; as the miniseries progresses into Clark's adulthood and debut as Superman, they visibly age and their appearances come to match those in The Man of Steel. This version also had Kal-El's spaceship not sensitive to Kryptonian DNA; anyone who got within proximity of the ship was shown the prerecorded message left by Jor-El and Lara, as well as scene of Kryptonian life. Jonathan and Martha are shown images of Krypton, although it is Martha who appears more fascinated with the scientifically advanced and beautiful race of Kryptonians.

At the conclusion of Geoff Johns and Gary Frank's "Brainiac" story arc, Pa Kent suffers a fatal heart attack during Brainiac's attack on Earth's sun. His funeral, attended by all his family and friends from Smallville, is shown in the Superman: New Krypton Special in which Martha, refusing to be a hindrance for their son, asks Clark to leave her alone at the farm and go attend the more pressing matter of Kandor's restoration and transformation in New Krypton. Despite her reassurances to Clark that she will be okay, Martha begins to suffer from loneliness at being alone on the Kent Farm. Sensing that Martha needed a friend, and also feeling lonely without Clark, Krypto arrives on the front porch, offering Martha much needed companionship.

Following the "Final Crisis" storyline, Clark returns from the 31st Century along with a newly resurrected Conner Kent. Conner moves back in with Martha, finding a new appreciation for Smallville and the farm, following his death. This further helps to assuage Martha's loneliness, as she states that she disliked living in a "quiet" house.

During the 2009 "Blackest Night" storyline, the body of the deceased Earth-Two Superman is turned into a Black Lantern, and goes on a killing spree through Smallville, culminating with the abduction of Pa's coffin from his grave, and the kidnapping of Ma by the Black Lantern Lois Lane of Earth-Two. The Earth-Two Superman declares that Ma and Pa will soon be back in each other's arms. While Conner and Clark deal with Earth-Two Superman, Martha is left to deal with the Black Lantern Lois, who chases Martha into the cornfield. However, Martha fights back against Black Lantern Lois, with the help of Krypto. Together, the two of them light the cornfield on fire, and Krypto temporarily severs Lois' connection to the Black Lantern Ring, allowing for Martha to survive.

After "Blackest Night" and the destruction of New Krypton, Superman set out to walk across America to re-establish a personal connection with the human race, feeling that he needed to remember what it was to be human after his time on New Krypton and the loss of his father. When talking about Superman's recent emotional upheaval during his walk, Batman speculates that part of the problem is that Clark never really experienced personal loss prior to Jonathan's death (Krypton's destruction having occurred when he was too young to have any emotional investment in it), although he is confident that his friend will come through recent events. Later on, Lex Luthor briefly acquires near-omnipotent power and attempts to drive Superman mad by forcing him to experience the human emotions he believed the alien merely faked to blend in with humanity, only to become outraged when his probing of his enemy's mind revealed that Superman's defining moment of tragedy was Jonathan's death, as he could not accept that his enemy was raised by humans or had such a good upbringing compared to his own anguished relationship with his father.

The New 52
In The New 52 (a 2011 reboot of the DC Comics universe), both Jonathan and Martha Kent have died following an incident with a drunk driver and Clark Kent has to grow into his role as Superman without them.

DC Rebirth
In the mini-series "Doomsday Clock", which concludes the 2016 DC Rebirth relaunch, it is revealed that the continuity of the 2011 DC Comics initiative The New 52 was caused by Doctor Manhattan, who also caused the Kents' death. Superman had a nightmare about their deaths. Doctor Manhattan is eventually convinced by Superman to undo his actions: the former timeline is restored and the Kents are restored to life. This was depicted where Clark was inspired by the tales of the Justice Society where he became Superboy and prevented their deaths.

Other versions
The Kent's Earth-3 counterparts appear briefly in the 2013–2014 "Forever Evil" storyline as part of Ultraman's origin. Young Jonathan and Martha Kent of Earth-Three are drug addicts in an abusive relationship. One day, while Jonathan is threatening Martha with a knife, Ultraman's space pod crash lands on their farm. Young Ultraman decides to blend into society until he is ready to conquer the planet, and forces Jonathan and Martha to act as his parents. It is revealed that sometime around the age of seven, Ultraman murders the Kents and burns down their farm, but keeps the name Clark Kent.

In the prequel to the video game Injustice: Gods Among Us, the President of the United States hires Mirror Master and a team of commandos to kidnap Jonathan and Martha to use them as bargaining chips in an attempt to end Superman's enforced peacekeeping. Superman and the Justice League successfully rescue them and Clark places them in the Fortress of Solitude to protect them after the government burned down Kent farm. When the Insurgency breaks into the Fortress to retrieve the super pill, Green Arrow accidentally hits Jonathan in the shoulder with one of his arrows when trying to combat Superman. Clark brutally beats Oliver to death, and Martha takes one of the pills to end his assault. The two confront their son over his unapologetic and dictatorial methods with Jor-El's hologram appearing and agreeing with the Kents that Clark has gone too far. As Superman ignores their pleads and flies out of the Fortress, the two apologize to Jor-El for failing to raise him properly while Jor-El apologizes to them for unleashing Kal-El onto this world.

In the prequel to the game's sequel, the Kents still live in the Fortress of Solitude knowing they'd be persecuted for their son's actions if they returned to Smallville, with their farm having been burned down. When the heroes arrive to free the Teen Titans from the Phantom Zone, they allow all of them in except for Harley Quinn (due to her contribution to Superman's turn to villainy).

In other media

Television

Animation
 Jonathan Kent appears in the Superboy segments of New Adventures of Superman.
 Jonathan and Martha Kent appears the 1988 Ruby-Spears-produced Superman series, voiced by Alan Oppenheimer and Tress MacNeille.
 Jonathan and Martha Kent appear in the DC Animated Universe, voiced by Shelley Fabares and Mike Farrell, who are married in real life.
 Martha Kent appears in Legion of Super Heroes, voiced by Jennifer Hale. Jonathan is only seen in a photograph at the end of the episode "Fear Factory". Lightning Lad also sarcastically refers to K3NT, the computer that raised Kell-El, as "a regular Ma and Pa Kent".
 Jonathan and Martha Kent appear in the Young Justice episode "True Colors", with Jonathan Kent voiced by Mark Rolston and Martha Kent having no dialogue. Jonathan first appears at a Lexcorp farming facility, taking a tour. He expresses his concern that these farms could put farmers out of business but the tour guide reassures him that the Reach are going to share their farming techniques to the agricultural community. He later allows Superboy, Nightwing, Robin, Impulse, Blue Beetle, and Arsenal to hide out in the Kent family's barn after a disastrous mission at a Lexcorp farming facility, saying that he's happy to have a reason for one of his boys to drop by (referring to Superboy).
 Martha Kent appears in the Super Best Friends Forever episode "Grounded" (as part of DC Nation Shorts). She breaks up a fight between Clark and his cousin Kara Zor-El in their superhero identities without a word and effortlessly sends the young Kryptonian girl to her room.
 Jonathan and Martha Kent appear in DC Super Hero Girls, voiced by Dean Cain and Helen Slater.
 Ma and Pa Kent appear in the Teen Titans Go! episode "Orangins".

Live-action
 Tom Fadden and Frances Morris play "Eben" and "Sarah" Kent in the first episode of the 1950s Adventures of Superman television series.
 Irene Tedrow and George Chandler play Martha and Jonathan Kent in the 1975 televised production of It's a Bird... It's a Plane... It's Superman!
 Stuart Whitman and Salome Jens play Jonathan and Martha in the television series Superboy, which aired from 1988 to 1992 in syndication.
 Jonathan and Martha Kent appear in Lois & Clark: The New Adventures of Superman, portrayed by Eddie Jones and K Callan respectively. Consistent with the post-Crisis comics' version of his story, Jonathan is alive and active in the grown Clark's life, and remains dedicated to running his farm. It is Martha who designs the Superman costume. When Superman is asked by the villain Tempus why a grown man like him would wear tights and a cape, Superman simply tells him, "My mother made it for me".

 Jonathan and Martha Kent appear in Smallville, portrayed by John Schneider and Annette O'Toole respectively. Unlike most adaptations, where they are depicted as elderly, this version of the Kents are in their early 40s at the start of the series. 
 Martha Kent appears in the Titans episode "Connor", portrayed by Sarah Deakins. She is seen in a flashback interacting with a younger Clark Kent.
 Jonathan and Martha appear in Superman & Lois, portrayed by Fred Henderson and Michele Scarabelli, respectively. Jonathan died of a heart attack while Clark was still a teenager, which Clark mentions influenced his decision to leave Smallville after he graduated. Martha continued to provide guidance to Clark as he became Superman and eventually a father to his own twin sons with Lois, Jonathan and Jordan. In the pilot episode, after Martha dies of a stroke, Clark and Lois learn from Lana Lang that Martha had a reverse mortgage on the farm to help with her neighbors' financial troubles, and to raise college funding for the twins, leading the couple to decide to purchase and move their family to the Kent farm.

Film

Animation
 In the Superman theatrical cartoons from the '40s, the Kents are not mentioned as the finders of baby Kal-El's rocket. Instead, the unseen "passing motorist" of the origin story in Action Comics #1 is referred to as the person who finds the rocket and takes the baby to an orphanage.
 Martha Kent appears in Superman: Doomsday, voiced by Swoosie Kurtz. In this film, Jonathan has been dead for many years.
 In the Superman/Batman: Apocalypse animated direct-to-video film, both Jonathan and Martha appear devastated as they come home and see that their farm has been destroyed. In an attempt to calm them, Superman and Supergirl reassure them that they will build them another one.
 Martha Kent appears in the direct-to-video animated film All-Star Superman (2011), voiced by Frances Conroy. Jonathan Kent's name appears in the tombstone when Superman lays a flower on his grave.
 Martha Kent appears in Superman: Unbound (2013), voiced again by Frances Conroy.
 Jonathan and Martha Kent appear in Superman: Brainiac Attacks, voiced again by Mike Farrell and Shelley Fabares respectively.
 Jonathan and Martha Kent appear in the animated film Superman vs The Elite (2012), with Jonathan voiced by Paul Eiding while Martha appears briefly with no dialogue.
 Jonathan and Martha Kent appear in the animated film JLA Adventures: Trapped in Time (2014), with Jonathan voiced by Tom Gibis and Martha voiced by Erica Luttrell.
 Jonathan and Martha Kent appear in the animated films The Death of Superman (2018) and Reign of the Supermen (2019), with Jonanthan voiced again by Paul Eiding and Martha voiced by Jennifer Hale.
 Jonathan and Martha Kent appear in the animated film Superman: Man of Tomorrow (2020), with Jonanthan voiced again by Neil Flynn and Martha voiced by Bellamy Young.
 Jonathan appears in the animated film Injustice, voiced by Kevin Pollak.

Live-action
 Edward Cassidy and Virginia Carroll play "Eben" and Martha Kent in the 1948 Superman movie serial starring Kirk Alyn.

 Glenn Ford and Phyllis Thaxter portray Jonathan and Martha in Superman: The Movie (1978). In the movie, they adopt Superman after the infant's spacecraft crashes near them as they drive down a road. Jonathan is giving a teenage Clark guidance of his purpose on Earth, only to die of a sudden myocardial infarction immediately afterwards. Clark is then beside himself that he could not have saved his stepfather, then tells Martha he must proceed to the Arctic Circle, whereupon he creates the Fortress of Solitude. When a full-grown Clark is hired at the Daily Planet, Clark requests for half of his salary to be sent to Martha at the family farm. At the end of the film, after Lois dies when her car falls into a sinkhole, Superman chooses to ignore Jor-El's warnings of tampering with human history and turns back time, refusing to fail Lois as he did Jonathan. Martha is indicated by Lana Lang to have died in Superman III (1983), and the farm is in the process of being sold by Clark in the beginning of Superman IV: The Quest for Peace.
 In the 2006 film Superman Returns (which is a semi-sequel to the 1978 film and 1980 film), Eva Marie Saint portrays Martha Kent. Photos of Glenn Ford as Jonathan Kent are briefly visible in Martha's living room.

DC Extended Universe
 
 Kevin Costner and Diane Lane portray Jonathan and Martha Kent in the DC Extended Universe, first appearing in the 2013 film Man of Steel. As a boy, Martha consoles Clark when his super sense threatens to overwhelm him. Conflict exists between Clark's desire to use his powers to help others, as when he saves schoolmates from drowning after a schoolbus falls into a river, and Jonathan's desire to keep Clark's powers a secret. When Clark grows into adulthood, the two are further at odds over Clark's desire to go out into the world, while Jonathan prefers that he continue the family farm. A pivotal moment interrupts this argument, when the Kents are confronted by a tornado. After they and other motorists take refuge beneath an overpass, Jonathan is separated from the others when he goes back to the car to rescue their dog, Hank. After Jonathan's leg is injured during this, and his ability to make it to the overpass threatened, Clark wants to rescue him, but Jonathan gestures for him not to, and in that moment of hesitancy on Clark's part, Jonathan dies swept away by the tornado. Years later, when General Zod and other Phantom Zone criminals arrives on Earth and demands from Martha the location of the spacecraft that brought Clark to Earth, Martha refuses to cooperate, and is saved only by the timely intervention of her son.
 In Batman v Superman: Dawn of Justice, Lex Luthor has Martha kidnapped and held hostage by Anatoli Knyazev to forces Superman to fight Batman. Superman convinces Batman to join forces against Luthor, and Batman rescues Martha. When Clark is killed by Doomsday in the film's climax, he is buried in a grave next to Jonathan's.
 In Justice League, Martha sells the Kent farm, as she cannot afford the bank's fees and she no longer has an attachment to Smallville following her son's death. When Superman is resurrected, she joyously reunites with Clark at the farm. Bruce Wayne buys the bank Martha owed money to, allowing her to keep the farm. The director's cut adds a scene in which Martian Manhunter masterquades as Martha to convince Lois Lane to re-enter society.

Video games
Jonathan and Martha Kent appear in DC Universe Online, voiced by Brandon Young and Diane Perella. They appear as supporting characters for the heroes. In the "Smallville Alert", Jonathan Kent is among the Smallville citizens who get turned into clones of Doomsday and the players have to regress him back to normal.

References

External links
 Supermanica: Jonathan and Martha Kent
 
 

DC Comics film characters
Fictional characters from Kansas
Fictional farmers
Fictional married couples
Fictional mayors
Fictional shopkeepers
Fictional United States senators
Comics characters introduced in 1939
Characters created by Jerry Siegel
Characters created by Joe Shuster
Superman characters